The Deer Creek Dam and Reservoir hydroelectric facilities are on the Provo River in western Wasatch County, Utah, United States, about  northeast of Provo. The dam contains 2,810,000 cubic yards (2,150,000 m³) of material and forms a reservoir of  capacity. Construction began in May 1938 and was completed in 1941. The reservoir supplies water for agricultural, municipal, and industrial use. Recreational activities on and around the reservoir include boating, fishing, camping, swimming and water skiing.

The Deer Creek Dam is the key structure of the Provo River Project managed by the U.S. Department of the Interior Bureau of Reclamation.

Deer Creek Reservoir is the main feature of Deer Creek State Park.

Deer Creek is home to several fish species, including Largemouth and Smallmouth Bass, Rainbow Trout, Brown Trout, Yellow Perch, Walleye and Common Carp.

See also

 List of dams and reservoirs in Utah

References

External links

 "Provo River Project".  Retrieved Jan. 10, 2006.
   by the Utah Division of Water Quality
 Deer Creek Reservoir - UtahDiving.com
 
 
 
 
 
 
 
 
 
 
 
 
 
 
 
 
 

Dams in Utah
Reservoirs in Utah
Hydroelectric power plants in Utah
Lakes of Wasatch County, Utah
Buildings and structures in Wasatch County, Utah
Tourist attractions in Wasatch County, Utah
United States Bureau of Reclamation dams
Dams completed in 1941
Energy infrastructure completed in 1941
Historic American Engineering Record in Utah
Historic American Buildings Survey in Utah
Civilian Conservation Corps in Utah